Zona Bruta (Spanish for “Uncouth Zone”) is a Spanish hip hop record label in Madrid founded in 1996. It was one of the first Spanish hip hop specialised labels, and the most important. It operates as a subsidiary of, and is distributed through, Warner Music.

Discography 
1996: VKR - Más Ke Dificultad
1996: CPV - Y Ahora Ke, Eh!
1997: El Meswy 	- Tesis Doctoral
1997: VKR - Mentes Revolucionarias
1997: CPV - La Saga Continúa
1998: VKR - Hasta La Viktoria
1998: Frank T- Los Pájaros No Pueden Vivir En El Agua Porque No Son Peces
1998: Arianna Puello- El Tentempié
1998: CPV - Guannais/A Muerte
1998: Mr. Rango- El Hombre De Los 6 Millones De Dólares
1998: CPV- Grandes Planes
1998: CPV- 29:30 Remix
1998: Frank T-  La Gran Obra Maestra
1999: El Imperio - Monopolio
1999: Mala Rodríguez - Toma La Traca/A Jierro
1999: Arianna Puello - Gancho Perfecto
1999: SFDK - "Siempre Fuerte"
1999: Frank T - Frankattack
2000: Hablando En Plata - "Operación Mafia Fantástica"
2000: Arianna Puello - "Arianna Puello y DJ Tillo"
2000: Jotamayúscula - "Hombre Negro Soltero Busca…"
2000: Moreno - XXL
2000: Moreno - Yakussy
2000: Kultama - Al Ritmo De La Noche
2000: SFDK - "Desde Los Chiqueros"
2001: Hermanos Herméticos - "Interiorismo"
2001: VKR - "Kreyentes"
2001: Uhno - Creo Que Jamás Volveré A Grabar Si No Se…
2001: Arianna Puello - La Flecha
2001: VKR - En Las Calles
2001: Hablando En Plata - A Sangre Fría
2001: Frank T - "90 Kilos"
2001: Dnoe - "El Blanco Dnoe"
2002: La Excepción - "¡En Tu Carriño Paio!"
2002: Mr. Rango - "Baby Tu/Night Fever"
2002: Dnoe - "Qué Piensan Las Mujeres 1:Personal"
2002: Guateque All Stars - "Guateque All Stars"
2002: Guateque All Stars - "Siesta"
2003: Arianna Puello - "Así Lo Siento"
2003: Hablando En Plata - "Supervillanos De Alquiler"
2003: Zenit - "Producto Infinito"
2003: La Excepción - " ¡Cata Cheli!"
2003: SFDK - "2001: Odisea En El Lodo"
2004: Elphomega - "One Man Army"
2004: Jotamayúscula - "Una Vida Xtra"
2005: Korazón Crudo - "Un Amor, Una Vida Delicada"
2005: Zenit - "Es El Momento"
2005: Elphomega - "Homoggedon"
2005: Aqeel - "Beats & Voices" 
2005: Aqeel - "Déjame" 
2005: Ikah - "La MecanIkah" 
2006: Ikah - "Calma" 
2006: La Excepción - "Aguantando El Tirón"
2006: Korazón Crudo - "El Último Romántico"
2006: Zenit - "Torre De Babel"
2006: Toscano - "País De Hipocresía"
2006: Frank T - "Sonrían Por Favor"
2006: Hablando En Plata - "La División De La Victoria"
2006: Jotamayúscula - "Camaleón"
2007: Sicario - "La Ley De Ohm"
2007: Elphomega - "El Testimonio Libra"
2007: Toscano - "Yo Underground"
2007: Arianna Puello - "Juana Kalamidad"
2008: ZPU - "Contradicziones"
2008: Arianna Puello - "13 Razones"
2008: Guateque All Stars - "Technicolor"
2008: Korazón Crudo - "El Club De Los Hombres Invisibles"
2008: +Graves - "Sonido Campeón"
2008: Guerra - "180°"

External links
 MySpace
 Official Website

Hip hop record labels